Harry Goz (February 16, 1932 – September 6, 2003) was an American musical theater actor and voice actor.

Career
Goz debuted in the 1956 Broadway production of Bajour, co-starring Chita Rivera and Nancy Dussault. Goz played Tevye in the Broadway musical Fiddler on the Roof from 1966 to 1968, both as understudy and lead actor. He appeared in musicals such as Two by Two and Chess, for which he was nominated in 1988 for a Drama Desk Award  in the Outstanding Featured Actor in a Musical category, and comedies such as The Prisoner of Second Avenue.

Goz had a number of TV and movie guest appearances throughout his career. He starred as The Big Apple in Fruit of the Loom underwear TV commercials during the 1970s and 80s. He portrayed Dr. Tom Walz in Bill, a 1981 television film. The same year, Goz portrayed Pepsi-Cola chairman and Joan Crawford's last husband, Alfred Steele, in the film adaption of Christina Crawford's book Mommie Dearest. In his later years, Goz became known to a new audience with his role as the voice of Captain Hazel "Hank" Murphy in the Cartoon Network Adult Swim series Sealab 2021.

Death
Goz died from multiple myeloma at the age of 71 on September 6, 2003.

Goz was survived by his wife, three children and nine grandchildren. His son, Michael Goz, took over as a new character on Sealab 2021 following his father's death.

Filmography

References

External links

1932 births
2003 deaths
American male musical theatre actors
American male voice actors
Jewish male actors
Deaths from multiple myeloma
Deaths from cancer in New York (state)
People from St. Louis
20th-century American singers
20th-century American male singers